The 2017 season was Pahang's 14th season in the Liga Super Malaysia since its inception in 2004. Pahang also participated in the Piala FA and Piala Malaysia. The season covers the period from 21 January 2017 to 28 October 2017.

Pahang lost the Piala FA Final to Kedah after a 2–3 loss on 20 May.

Players

First team squad 

*  Player names in bold denotes player that left during mid-season

Technical staff

Transfers
First transfer window started in December 2017 to 22 January 2017 and second transfer window started on 15 May 2017 to 11 June 2017.

In

December to January

May to June

Out

December to January

May to June

Competitions

Overall

Overview

Liga Super 
The league kick-off on 21 January and ends on 21 October 2017.

League table

Results summary

Results by round

Fixtures and results

First leg

Second leg

Piala FA 
The tournament kick-off on 5 February and ends on 20 May 2017.

Results summary

Knockout phase

Round of 32

Round of 16

Quarter-finals

Semi-finals

Final

Piala Malaysia

Results summary

Group stage

Knockout stage

Statistics

Appearances

Top scorers 
Correct as of match played on 28 October 2017
The list is sorted by shirt number when total goals are equal.

*  Player names in bold denotes player that left during mid-season

Clean sheets
Correct as of match played on 28 October 2017
The list is sorted by shirt number when total clean sheets are equal.

Home attendance

Matches (all competitions)
All matches played at Darul Makmur Stadium.

References

External links

Sri Pahang FC
Sri Pahang FC seasons
2017 in Malaysian football
Malaysian football clubs 2017 season